Tinayre is a surname and may refer to
 Daniel Tinayre (1910–1994), Argentine director, screenwriter and producer
 Julien Tinayre (1859–1923), French illustrator and wood engraver
 Louis Tinayre (1861–1942), French illustrator and painter
 Marcelle Tinayre (1870–1948), French author